To Be Continued... is the sixth studio album by Singaporean singer Stefanie Sun, released on 10 January 2003 by Warner Music Taiwan. The album earned an IFPI Hong Kong Top Sales Music Award for Top 10 Best Selling Mandarin Albums of the Year in 2003.

Track listing
 "神奇" (Magical) 
 "我不難過" (I Am Fine) 
 "永遠" (Forever) 
 "未完成" (To Be Continued) 
 "接下來" (Following) 
 "學會" (Learnt) 
 "年輕無極限" (Youth Without Limit) 
 "了解" (To Know) 
 "休止符" (A Rest) 
 "沒有人的方向" (A Direction Without Anyone) 
 "My Story, Your Song" feat. Mai Kuraki

References

2003 albums
Stefanie Sun albums
Warner Music Taiwan albums